The 4th Central Auditing Committee (CAC) of the Workers' Party of Korea (WPK), officially the Central Auditing Committee of the 4th Congress of the Workers' Party of Korea, was elected by the 4th Congress on 19 September 1961.

Members

References

Citations

Bibliography
Books:
 
 
  

Dissertations:
 

4th Central Auditing Committee of the Workers' Party of Korea
1961 establishments in North Korea
1970 disestablishments in North Korea